The European Team Gymnastics Championships, initially held as the European Gymnastics Masters, was a competition organized by the European Union of Gymnastics combining men's and women's artistic gymnastics and rhythmic gymnastics events.

History
The competition was first held in 1997 under the name European Gymnastics Masters in Paris, France. A second edition of the tournament, still as European Gymnastics Masters, was held in 1999 in Patras, Greece. In 2001 the competition was renamed to European Team Gymnastics Championships. It was last held in 2003. All four editions of the tournament were organized by the European Union of Gymnastics.

Editions

Medals by country
1997–2003

See also
 European Gymnastics Championships
 European Men's Artistic Gymnastics Championships
 European Women's Artistic Gymnastics Championships
 Rhythmic Gymnastics European Championships

References

 
Artistic gymnastics competitions
European championships
Gymnastics in Europe
Recurring sporting events established in 1997
Recurring sporting events disestablished in 2003